Trapezites petalia, the common white spot skipper or black-ringed ochre, is a butterfly of the family Hesperiidae. It is found in the Australian states of Queensland and New South Wales.

The wingspan is about 30 mm.

The larvae feed on Lomandra filiformis, Lomandra longifolia and Lomandra multiflora.

External links
 Australian Caterpillars

Trapezitinae
Butterflies described in 1868
Butterflies of Australia
Taxa named by William Chapman Hewitson